Sebastian Krenz (born 1992) is a German singer. He is the winner of the eleventh season of The Voice of Germany in 2021.

References

German male singers
21st-century German male singers
1992 births
Living people
The Voice (franchise) winners